= Traber Derby Spiel =

Traber Derby Spiel is a board game published in 1989 by BURK-Verlag.

== Contents ==
Traber Derby Spiel is a game in which eight teams of horses are driven around a harness racing track.

== Reception ==
Derek Carver reviewed Traber Derby for Games International magazine, and gave it 4 stars out of 5, and stated that "While not agreeing that it is in the same class as the unique Win, Place & Show I would certainly recommend it."
